The following is a list of current and former Major League Baseball spring training cities.

Some Toronto Blue Jays regular-season home games for 2021 were played in TD Ballpark in Dunedin, Florida.

Current cities

Grapefruit League (Florida)

Cactus League (Arizona)

See also
List of MLB stadiums
List of MLB spring training ballparks
Lists of baseball parks

References

External links

cities
Spring training cities
Spring training